Tine Slabe, Slovenian windsurfer, born 26 August 1980, Koper.

He is competing: slalom, freestyle wave. He won Shimuni extreme 2010 and Canarian slalom tour 2011. He achieved to windsurf at Cape Horn, South America  and holds national windsurfing record in speed windsurfing (71 km/h).

Early life

Surfing career

Business career

Different Eyewear

Recharge.si

Results

Achievements 
 First human windsurf around Cape Horn, South America.
 National record speed windsurfing 71 km/h.

Competitions

External links

 Profil primorci.si
 Different eyewear delo.si
 PWA World Windsurfing tour

References

1980 births
Living people